The 2012–13 season was Shirak's 22nd consecutive season in the Armenian Premier League and covers the period from 1 January 2012 to 30 June 2013. Shirak finished the season by winning their fourth Premier League title, whilst they lost to Pyunik in the final of the Armenian Cup. In Europe, Shirak defeated Rudar Pljevlja in the first qualifying round of the UEFA Europa League before being knocked out by Bnei Yehuda in the second qualifying round.

Squad

Transfers

In

Loan in

Out

Loan out

Released

Competitions

Premier League

Results summary

Results

Table

Armenian Cup

2011–12

Final

2012–13

Final

UEFA Europa League

Qualifying rounds

Statistics

Appearances and goals

|-
|colspan="16"|Players away on loan:

|-
|colspan="16"|Players who left Shirak during the season:

|}

Goal scorers

Clean sheets

Disciplinary Record

References

Shirak SC seasons
Shirak